Iceland's first ambassador to India was Pétur Thorsteinsson in 1976. Iceland's present ambassador to India is Guðmundur Árni Stefánsson, who presented his credentials to President Ram Nath Kovind on 20 September 2018. While Iceland has an acreditted ambassador since 1976, the Embassy of Iceland was formally opened only on 26 February 2006. Aside from India, the Embassy's area of jurisdiction includes Bangladesh, Nepal and Sri Lanka.

List of ambassadors

See also
Iceland–India relations
Foreign relations of Iceland
Ambassadors of Iceland
List of ambassadors and high commissioners to India

References

List of Icelandic representatives (Icelandic Foreign Ministry website) 

1976 establishments
Main
India
Iceland